Will Tremper (19 September 1928 – 14 December 1998) was a German journalist and filmmaker (writer, director, producer). He wrote twelve screenplays between 1956 and 1988. The young and then unknown actor Horst Buchholz starred in his first three films. With only a handful of films to his credit, he established himself quickly as the German answer to the directors of the Nouvelle Vague in France.

Biography
Will Tremper was born in Braubach, Germany to innkeeper Heinrich Tremper and his wife Emilie and died in Munich, Germany. Tremper arrived in 1944 in Berlin at the age of 16, to work as a photographer. He survived the war unharmed and started working for a newly established Berlin newspaper Der Tagesspiegel.

In the 1950s he started writing screenplays. His debut Teenage Wolfpack was a huge success and made Horst Buchholz a star. He financed his next four films by himself. With  Tremper received the Bundesfilmpreis for best production of the year.

After his last film as director, How Did a Nice Girl Like You Get Into This Business? which was produced by Horst Wendlandt, he wrote several bestselling novels. Tremper further went on to work for German newspapers and magazines, such as Die Welt, Welt am Sonntag, Bunte, Stern and Quick. His weekly film column in Welt am Sonntag ran from 1980 to 1998.

In December 1998 Tremper died of a heart attack at his home in Munich.

Selected filmography

 Teenage Wolfpack (dir. Georg Tressler, 1956)
  (dir. Georg Tressler, 1958)
 Wet Asphalt (dir. Frank Wisbar, 1958)
 People in the Net (dir. Franz Peter Wirth, 1959)
  (dir. Will Tremper, 1961)
  (dir. Edwin Zbonek, 1962)
  (dir. Will Tremper, 1963)
 Stop Train 349 (dir. Rolf Hädrich, 1963)
 Room 13 (dir. Harald Reinl, 1964)
 Waiting Room to the Beyond (dir. Alfred Vohrer, 1964)
 Sperrbezirk (dir. Will Tremper, 1966)
  (OT: Playgirl) (dir. Will Tremper, 1966)
 How Did a Nice Girl Like You Get Into This Business? (dir. Will Tremper, 1970)
 Rosinenbomber (dir. Eberhard Itzenplitz, 1988, TV film)

Awards
1963: Preis der deutschen Filmkritik for Die endlose Nacht
1963: Filmband in Silber (Production) for Die endlose Nacht
1963: Bambi Award (Best Film) for Die endlose Nacht
1964: Filmband in Gold (Drehbuch) für Stop Train 349

References

External links

1928 births
1998 deaths
German male journalists
Film people from Rhineland-Palatinate
German autobiographers
German male writers
20th-century German journalists